Kurt Ehrenreich Floericke (also spelled Curt and/or Flöricke; 23 March 1869, in Zeitz – 29 October 1934, in Stuttgart) was a German naturalist and author of numerous popular science books.

From 1889, Floericke studied natural sciences in Breslau and Marburg and he gained a doctorate in 1893 in Marburg with a thesis on the bird fauna of Silesia and worked as an assistant to Richard Greef. He then extended his studies to east and south-east Europe, North Africa, the Middle East, and South America. In 1902, he moved to Vienna, where he made a living as an author. His financial position was assured when he became the editor and owner of Kosmos Die Zeitschrift für alle Freunde der Natur ("Kosmos Magazine for the Friends of Nature 1904-, Stuttgart). Floericke inspired the formation of the Süddeutsche Vogelwarte, the South German Ornithological Institute.

Bibliography
Einheimische Fische (1913)
Schnecken und Muscheln (1920)
Spinnen und Spinnenleben (1921)
Allerlei Gewürm (1921)
Heuschrecken und Libellen (1922)
Falterleben (1923)
Aussterbende Tiere (1927)

References
Andreas Daum, Wissenschaftspopularisierung im 19. Jahrhundert: Bürgerliche Kultur, naturwissenschaftliche Bildung und die deutsche Öffentlichkeit, 1848–1914. Munich: Oldenbourg, 1998, 2nd. edition 2002, including a short biography.
Ulrich Franke: Dr. Curt Floericke - Naturforscher, Ornithologe, Schriftsteller. Mit der ersten umfassenden Bibliographie seiner Schriften. 2009.

External links
floericke online.
http://caliban.mpiz-koeln.mpg.de/floericke/
 
 

1869 births
1934 deaths
People from Zeitz
People from the Province of Saxony
19th-century German zoologists
German ornithologists
20th-century German zoologists